Costantino Bresciani Turroni (26 February 1882, in Verona, Italy – 7 December 1963, in Milan, Italy) was an Italian economist and statistician.

Biography
He moved to Berlin for three years where he took an active part in the University of Berlin's laboratory of economy. In 1907 obtained the university teaching in statistics at Pavia, from 1909 taught at Palermo and then, until 1919, in Genoa. In 1925 he taught political economy at Bologna and signed the Anti-Fascist Intellectuals Manifesto. Then he taught in Milan and in 1927 in Cairo. In 1920 the Ministry of Foreign Affairs appointed him a member of the Italian delegation to the Reparation Commission and entered into force on the Dawes Plan in 1924, is financial advisor of the Agent General for the payment of reparations in Berlin in this regard, in 1931, published the essay Le Vicende del Marco tedesco ("The events of the German mark"—tr. Sayers 1937 as "The Economics of inflation").

In 1933 he resigned from ' Academy of Italy, the former Accademia Nazionale dei Lincei, not to swear allegiance to the Fascist regime. In 1937 he went back to teaching at the University of Milan, which he continued to do until 1957. In 1942 public introduction to economic policy, which expresses a fierce critic of the airship, called for the abolition of barriers currency, the return to convertibility of the currency under a fixed exchange rate system, the re-establishment of market economy and free enterprise as a powerful engine of economic development.

In 1945 he became president of the Bank of Rome and in the same year he published the "program of economic and social liberalism" for the Liberal Party. From 1947 to 1951 was executive director of the International Bank for Reconstruction and Development. From August 1953 to January 1954 he was the Italian Minister of Foreign Trade. He organized the first Law on export credit insurance.

Research Interests
Economics and Statistics

Education
Degree in law, Padua, with a dissertation on Monetary circulation and economic development.

Academic Positions
Professor of Statistics at Universities of Padua, Milan (1909), Palermo (1909–1919), Genova (1919–1925). Professor of Political Economy  at Bologna University (1925), Milan and The Cairo University (1927).

Honours,Awards
Honorary member of American Economic Association, member of the Institut de France.

Known for
Pareto laws, Economic Indices

Notes

Publications

 Il primo anno di applicazione del piano Dawes, Riforma sociale, (1926);
 Economics Of Inflation: A Study Of Currency Depreciation In Post War Germany 1914-1923 (1937)
 On the Pareto’s Law, Journal of the Royal statistical Society, (1939);
 The Problem of the Cross-Rates of Exchange, Review of the Economic Conditions in Italy,(1948);
 Osservazioni sulla Teoria del moltiplicatore, Rivista Bancaria, XX,3, (1939);
 Considerazioni sui barometri economici, Giornale degli Economisti e Rivista di Statistica, (1928);
 Sui metodi per la misurazione del deprezzamento di una moneta cartacea, Rivista bancaria, (1923);
 Sul significato logico del coefficiente di correlazione, Giornale degli Economisti e Rivista di Statistica, (1914);
 Osservazioni critiche sul metodo del Wolf per lo studio della distribuzione dei redditi, Giornale degli Economisti e Rivista di Statistica, (1914);
 Sul carattere delle leggi statistiche, Giornale degli Economisti e Rivista di Statistica, (1910);
 Liberalismo e politica economica, Collezione di Testi e di Studi, Il Mulino, Bologna, (2006).

External links
 
 http://sites.google.com/site/dizionariosis/dizionario-statistico/statistici-a-c/bresciani-turroni-costantino

1882 births
1963 deaths
Scientists from Verona
Government ministers of Italy
Members of the National Council (Italy)
Italian statisticians
20th-century Italian economists
Fellows of the Econometric Society
Academic staff of the University of Milan